Stuart Cornfeld (November 13, 1952 – June 26, 2020) was an American film producer. He was business partners with Ben Stiller in the company Red Hour Productions.

Biography

Cornfeld was born in Los Angeles, California. He attended the University of California, Berkeley in the early 1970s, and graduated with a degree in Psychology. He graduated from the AFI Conservatory in 1975.

The appearance and personality of Les Grossman, the hotheaded and foul-mouthed Hollywood producer played by Tom Cruise in Stiller's film Tropic Thunder, is reportedly based in part on Cornfeld.

On June 26, 2020, Cornfeld died of cancer at age 67.

Filmography

As producer

Fatso
The Fly
Starsky & Hutch
Dodgeball: A True Underdog Story
Duplex
Tenacious D in The Pick of Destiny
Moving
Kafka
Zoolander
Blades of Glory
The Ruins
Tropic Thunder
The Boys: The Sherman Brothers' Story (executive)
Megamind (executive)
Submarine (executive)
30 Minutes or Less
The Big Year
Vamps
The Secret Life of Walter Mitty
Zoolander 2
The Polka King

As actor
 Fast Times at Ridgemont High
 Darkman
 Old School

References

External links

2020 deaths
People from Tarzana, Los Angeles
1952 births
UC Berkeley College of Letters and Science alumni
Film producers from California
AFI Conservatory alumni
Male actors from Los Angeles
American male television actors
American male film actors
Deaths from cancer in Pennsylvania